The Smooth Tour was the fourth headlining concert tour by the American country music duo Florida Georgia Line. The tour of the United States was in support of their third studio album, Dig Your Roots (2016). It began on June 3, 2017, in Austin, Texas, and concluded on October 21, 2017, in Alpharetta, Georgia.

Background
In February 2017, Florida Georgia Line announced the tour.

Opening acts
Backstreet Boys 
Russell Dickerson 
Ryan Hurd 
Chris Lane
Nelly
Morgan Wallen

Setlists
{{hidden
| headercss = background: #FFFF00; font-size: 100%; width: 59%;
| contentcss = text-align: left; font-size: 100%; width: 75%;
| header = Smooth Tour Setlist
| content = 

Florida Georgia Line
"Anything Goes"
"Smile"
"Round Here"
"Confession"
"Dig Your Roots"
"May We All"
"Dirt"
"Sippin' on Fire"
"H.O.L.Y."
"God, Your Mama, and Me"
"Sun Daze" 
"Get Your Shine On"
"This Is How We Roll"
Encore
"Hot in Herre 
"Cruise (Remix)" 

Nelly
"Party People"
"E.I"
"Where the Party At" 
"Where the Party At"
"Batter Up"
"Air Force Ones"
"Country Grammar (Hot Shit)"
"Ride Wit Me"
"The Fix"
"Die a Happy Man" 
"Sounds Good to Me"
"Get Like Me"
"Grillz"
"Move that Body"
"All I Do Is Win/Fake Love/That's What I Like"
"Body On Me"
"Over and Over"
"Dilemma"
"Just a Dream"

Chris Lane
"Who's It Gonna Be"
"Her Own Kind of Beautiful"
"Let Me Love You"
"For Her"
"I Want It That Way/Can't Feel My Face/SexyBack/Want to Want Me/Bye Bye Bye/Whip (Nae Nae)/It's Going Down for Real"
"Fix"
}}
{{hidden
| headercss = background: #FFFF00; font-size: 100%; width: 59%;
| contentcss = text-align: left; font-size: 100%; width: 75%;
| header = Boston, Minneapolis & Chicago Setlists
| content = 

Florida Georgia Line
"Anything Goes"
"Smile"
"Round Here"
"Confession"
"Dig Your Roots"
"May We All"
"Dirt"
"Sippin' on Fire"
"H.O.L.Y."
"God, Your Mama, and Me" 
"Sun Daze" 
"Get Your Shine On"
"This Is How We Roll"
Encore
"Hot in Herre 
"Everybody (Backstreet's Back)" 
"Cruise (Remix)" 

Backstreet Boys
"Larger Than Life"
"The One"
"Get Down (You're the One for Me)"
"Drowning
"Quit Playing Games (With My Heart)"
"As Long as You Love Me
"The Call"
"We've Got It Goin' On"
"I Want It That WayNelly'''
"Party People"
"E.I"
"Where the Party At" 
"Where the Party At"
"Batter Up"
"Air Force Ones"
"Country Grammar (Hot Shit)"
"Ride Wit Me"
"The Fix"
"Die a Happy Man" 
"Sounds Good to Me"
"Get Like Me"
"Grillz"
"Move that Body"
"All I Do Is Win/Fake Love/That's What I Like"
"Body On Me"
"Over and Over"
"Dilemma"
"Just a Dream"

Chris Lane
"Who's It Gonna Be"
"Her Own Kind of Beautiful"
"Let Me Love You"
"For Her"
"Can't Feel My Face/SexyBack/Want to Want Me/Bye Bye Bye/Whip (Nae Nae)/It's Going Down for Real"
"Fix"
}}

Shows

References

2017 concert tours